Hennessy Catholic College is an independent Roman Catholic co-educational secondary day school, located in the town of Young, New South Wales, Australia. The College was established in 2000, and in 2013 had a school population of over 550 students, catering for students in Year 7 to Year 12.

See also

 List of Catholic schools in New South Wales
 Catholic education in Australia

References

Catholic secondary schools in New South Wales
Young, New South Wales
Educational institutions established in 2000
2000 establishments in Australia